The women's 59 kilograms competition at the 2021 World Weightlifting Championships was held on 11 December 2021.

Schedule

Medalists

Records

Results

References

Results

Women's 59 kg
World Championships